Aibga is a village straddling the border between Abkhazia/Georgia and Russia.

Geography 
The village is located on both banks of the river Psou, at an altitude of 840 meters above sea level. The State border divides the village into two parts.

Population 
According to the deputy of Abkhazia's de facto parliament Valery Kvarchia "in summer the village inhabited by 26 people, but in winter there remains few, only the most courageous and strong".

Notes and references

See also
 Gagra District

External links 
 სოფელი აიბღა – რუსულ–აფხაზური „განხეთქილების ვაშლი“ // Presa.ge
 აიბღა. რუსულ-აფხაზური დავის შესახებ (ვიდეო)

Populated places in Gagra District
Black Sea Governorate